Avasarala Rama Rao is an Indian politician. He was the President of the Bharatiya Jana Sangh. He was a member of the Andhra Pradesh Legislative Council.

References

Bharatiya Jana Sangh politicians
Members of the Andhra Pradesh Legislative Council
Living people
Year of birth missing (living people)